Dyad is Michael Brodsky's fourth novel.  It is narrated by an urban lowlife known only as X—.  He is hired by the dying tycoon Jamms, who wants X— to convince Jamms's estranged artist son Jim to come home, and let bygones be bygones.

The "dyad" of the title refers to two people who are linked, what Beckett called a "pseudo-couple".  X—, speaking about Jim, says:

As is clear from the above quotation, metafictional issues are present in the novel.  X— makes frequent reference to the "story-mongers" and "meaning-mongers", and is constantly trying to figure out whether trivial matters that happen qualify as "incidents" or "events" or are otherwise "part of the story".

Sources
Brodsky, on the copyright page, acknowledges Noël Burch Theory of Film Practice (1973), translated from Praxis du cinema (1969), for an idea that he explores in the novel.

Plot summary

The novel begins with Mr. Jamms hiring X— to convince his estranged artist son Jim to return for one last visit home before Mr. Jamms dies of his just diagnosed terminal illness.  X— has three qualifications: his own father died the previous winter, he once knew Jim, and he bears a strong visual resemblance to Jim.

X— finds Jim in Rhinebeck, living with Maggy and Bessy.  Jim explains his refusal to see his parents, recalling a previous medical episode and extensive philosophizing.  Maggy tells a little about the hostile attitude of the father's doctor, one Doctor Scotoma.  Yet Jim and X— end up on a train back to Manhattan.  They dine and barhop.  Soon after three in the morning they encounter a policeman, and Jim offers up a photograph, apparently of his parents, an event that X— obsesses over.  They then run into Joe Testic, a friend of Jim, an acquaintance of X—.  At dawn, they part.  X— wanders around the Financial District.

Later, while dining in a fine restaurant, one Colletti asks X— to recruit Jim for help distributing some pharmaceuticals of an unspecified nature.  X— arranges a meet, and Jim refuses.  Afterwards, as Jim walks away through a park, X— bashes Jim's head in with a rock, and buries him under the leaves.  X— types a letter in Jim's name, claiming to take a sabbatical.  X— visits Jim's residence, and picks up clothing from Maggy.

X— stays in Jim's hotel room.  While Colletti is there, Joe Testic pays a visit, and recognizes Jim's clothing on X—.  Colletti kills Testic, and X— helps Colletti bury the body.  Two police detectives soon interrogate X— about Jim and Testic.  They talk philosophy, they know Testic is dead, they suspect Jim is dead also, they encourage X— to continue in his normal business.

X— travels on business for Colletti to a Florida island.  He is accosted by Testic's father, who accuses X— of the murder of his son.  He is also accosted by Doctor Scotoma, who speaks very negatively about drugs.  X— returns to New York, and meets with Mrs. Jamms, her own private detective, and Maggy.

Mr. Jamms dies.  The private detective invites X— for another talk, which turns out to be in the company of the two police detectives who talked with X— earlier.  In the end, they exonerate X—, who makes plans for another trip.

Reception

References

1989 American novels
American philosophical novels
Novels set in Manhattan
Novels by Michael Brodsky
Postmodern novels